Pinxton Football Club is a football club based in Pinxton, Derbyshire.

History
Pinxton joined the Central Midlands League in 2004–05 and gained promotion to the Supreme Division in their debut season after finishing in fourth place. They were then relegated straight back to the Premier Division despite finishing just below mid-table but immediately returned to the top division where they played until the league was re-organised along geographical lines in 2011.

Records
FA Vase: Third round 2015–16

References

External links

Football clubs in Derbyshire
Football clubs in England
Central Midlands Football League
Midlands Regional Alliance
Mining association football teams in England